Merritt may refer to:

 Merritt (given name)
 Merritt (surname)
Merritt Parkway, a limited access highway in Connecticut, United States, known as "The Merritt"

Places
Canada
Merritt, British Columbia
United States
Merritt, California
Merritt Island AVA, California wine region in Yolo County
Merritt, Michigan
Merritt Township, Michigan
Merritt, Missouri
Merritt, South Dakota
Merritt, Washington
Merritt Island, Florida

See also
 Merit (disambiguation)
 Meritt (disambiguation)
 Merrit (disambiguation)